Anjil Si Kabud Tabar (also Romanized as Ānjīl Sī Kabūd Tabār) is a village in Deraz Kola Rural District, Babol Kenar District, Babol County, Mazandaran Province, Iran. At the 2006 census, its population was 66, in 17 families.

References 

Populated places in Babol County